Luis Philippe Santos Manzano, also known by his nickname Lucky, is a Filipino-American TV host, actor, comedian, VJ, and model. He is the son of actors Edu Manzano and Vilma Santos. He is best known for his roles in the television series Komiks Presents: Flash Bomba as Roldan Legaspi and in the 2009 film In My Life as Mark Salvacion.

Biography

Early life
Manzano is the only child of Vilma Santos and Edu Manzano.

Education
He studied at Colegio de San Agustin for high school and at De La Salle–College of Saint Benilde in Malate, Manila, with a Major in Hotel and Restaurant Institution Management.

Family
Senator Ralph Recto is his stepfather, husband to his politician actress mother, Vilma Santos. He has a younger half-brother named Ryan Christian Recto. From his father side, Edu Manzano, he has two younger half siblings named Addie and Enzo.  His cousin is Andi Manzano, a former VJ for MTV PH (formerly MTV Philippines), and also a current radio DJ for Magic 89.9 FM.

Career
Manzano started his career as a commercial model for clothing brand, "Human". He later pursued a TV hosting and acting career. He is known to be one of the longest serving VJ on Myx channel with Iya Villania. His best known act "Roldan" in a television series Komiks Presents: Flash Bomba and "Mark Salvacion" in the 2009 film In My Life, where he portrayed a homosexual man, and starred alongside his mother, Vilma Santos.

Manzano is a member of Tau Gamma Phi, a fraternity established in the Philippines. He also is a member of DLS-CSB Romancon Dance Company.

Personal life
Manzano owns a taxi company, LBR Transport Inc.

Manzano began dating actress Jessy Mendiola in June 2016 and became engaged on December 12, 2020. He and Mendiola were married on February 21, 2021.

On August 11, 2022, the couple announced that they are expecting their first child. Their daughter, Isabella Rose Tawile Manzano was born on December 29, 2022.

Filmography

Film

Television

Awards and nominations

References

External links
 

Filipino male television actors
Filipino game show hosts
Living people
Male actors from Metro Manila
De La Salle–College of Saint Benilde alumni
Filipino male comedians
VJs (media personalities)
Visayan people
Filipino male film actors
Viva Artists Agency
ABS-CBN personalities
Your Face Sounds Familiar (Philippine TV series)
Filipino television variety show hosts